Natalie Hunter may refer to:

Natalie Hunter (TV presenter)
Natalie Hunter (canoeist) (born 1967), Australian sprint canoeist
Natalie Marlowe, née Hunter, a character from the soap opera All My Children